Charles Glenn Wallis (1914-1944) was an American poet, and English translator of French, Classical Greek, and Latin.

He graduated in 1936 with a BA from the University of Virginia.  During 1936-37 he was a member of the Committee on Liberal Education at the University of Chicago, and from July 1937 until 1942 he was a tutor and editor at St. John's College (Annapolis/Santa Fe) Maryland.  During those years while he was in his twenties he was the first person ever to translate numerous difficult late medieval, early modern texts into English from Latin, including Copernicus''' On The Revolutions of the Heavenly Spheres, Kepler 's Epitome of Copernican Astronomy, and Harmonies of the World as well as the 12th-13'th century English Philosopher Robert Grosseteste 's On Light.  He published at least one story, "The Return", posthumously in Nicholas Moore and Douglas Newton's Atlantic Anthology'' (1945). Like a number of his poems, it is homoerotic in content.

His parents were Benjamin Hayward Wallis and Eleanor Sewell Glenn.  He was eight months old when his father died on Jan 4, 1915.  Charles Glenn himself died when he was thirty at St Vincents Hospital in New York City on May 4, 1944 on or near his 30th birthday from an accidental fall.

References 

20th-century American poets
American male poets
1944 deaths
20th-century American male writers
1914 births
Accidental deaths from falls
University of Virginia alumni